Captain Dynamo may refer to:
 Captain Dynamo (character), a fictional comic book superhero
 Captain Dynamo (video game), a platform game that was released for the Commodore Amiga and other platforms in 1992, developed by Codemasters